Jeremy Taiwo (born January 15, 1990, in Ballard, Washington) is an American decathlete. His father, Joseph Taiwo, is a Nigerian former triple jumper who competed at the 1984 and 1988 Summer Olympics.  His mother Irene is Colombian and a lawyer In Seattle for the National Relations Board.

Taiwo qualified for the USA team on July 3, 2016, at the Eugene Track and Field Hayward Field TrackTown USA qualifying matches.  He scored a total of 8425 points for a silver medal.  325 points behind Ashton Eaton.

Prep
He was educated at Newport High School and the University of Washington, and competed in college athletics for the Washington Huskies.

Major competition record
He competed at the 2013 World Championships in Moscow, Russia and 2015 World Championships in Beijing China.

USA National Track and field Championships

Personal bests

References

External links
 
 
 Jeremy Taiwo at University of Washington
 Jeremy Taiwo at All-Athletics.com
 
 
 Jeremy Taiwo at AthleteBiz.us

1990 births
Living people
American male decathletes
American Ninja Warrior contestants
Sportspeople from Renton, Washington
Track and field athletes from Washington (state)
World Athletics Championships athletes for the United States
American sportspeople of Nigerian descent
Washington Huskies men's track and field athletes
University of Washington alumni
Athletes (track and field) at the 2016 Summer Olympics
Olympic track and field athletes of the United States
USA Indoor Track and Field Championships winners